
Irvin Shortess "Shorty" Yeaworth Jr. (February 14, 1926 – July 19, 2004) was a German-born American film director, producer, screenwriter and theme park builder. He began his career singing at age 10 at KDKA in Pittsburgh, Pennsylvania. He later became a radio producer. He directed more than 400 films for motivational, educational, and religious purposes, including television specials for evangelist Billy Graham. As an impresario, he directed the Wayne (Pa.) Concert Series from 1979 to 2003. However, he is best known for directing the classic film The Blob which depicts a growing, devouring alien slime.

In the 1970s he began leading American Christians on tours of Israel and Jordan which he continued to do up until his death. While in these countries he designed and produced World's Fair and theme park pavilions for local enterprises.

He was married to Jean Yeaworth for 59 years, who worked on most of his films as music supervisor or writer, and together they had five children. Before he died in a road accident in Amman, he was building a theme park called Jordanian Experience at the Aqaba Gateway in Jordan.

In 2007, The Colonial Theatre in Phoenixville, Pennsylvania (the filming location of the famous "Running Out" scene in The Blob) honored Irvin Yeaworth and The Blob by holding a film contest in which amateur film-makers competed for the "Shorty" award, named after Yeaworth's nickname.

Filmography

Director
 The Flaming Teen-Age (1956) (also writer and producer)
 The Blob (1958)
 4D Man (1959) (also producer)
 Dinosaurus! (1960) (also producer)
 The Gospel Blimp (1967) (also producer)
 Way Out (1967) (also producer)

References

External links
 
 

1926 births
2004 deaths
Road incident deaths in Jordan
Film directors from Berlin
Film directors from Pennsylvania
German emigrants to the United States
American film producers
American male screenwriters
20th-century American male writers
20th-century American screenwriters